"Dreams Come True" is a Hey! Say! JUMP single. It peaked at No. 1 on the weekly Oricon chart and sold 249,024 copies in total. The single ranked No. 25 on the yearly Oricon chart for 2008.

Track listing

Regular edition
CD
 "Dreams Come True"
 "Oretachi no Seishun" - Yuya Takaki
 "Chance to Change"
 "Dreams Come True" (Original Karaoke)
 "Oretachi no Seishun" (Original Karaoke) - Yuya Takaki
 "Chance to Change" (Original Karaoke)

Limited edition
CD
 "Dreams Come True"

DVD
 "Dreams Come True" (PV & Making of)

Chart

Total reported sales: 249,024

References

2008 singles
2008 songs
Hey! Say! JUMP songs
J Storm singles
Oricon Weekly number-one singles
Billboard Japan Hot 100 number-one singles
Songs about dreams